Electoral district of Bennettswood was an electoral district of the Legislative Assembly in the Australian state of Victoria.

Members for Bennetswood

McLaren had represented Caulfield 1965–1967.

Election results

References
Re-Member database Parliament of Victoria

Former electoral districts of Victoria (Australia)
1967 establishments in Australia
2002 disestablishments in Australia